"Forever" is a song recorded by American country music artist John Michael Montgomery.  It was released in October 2008 as the third single from the album Time Flies.  The song reached #28 on the Billboard Hot Country Songs chart.  The song was written by James T. Slater.

Chart performance

References

2008 singles
John Michael Montgomery songs
2008 songs
Songs written by James T. Slater
Song recordings produced by Byron Gallimore